Mahoning Furnace is an unincorporated community in Mahoning Township, Armstrong County, Pennsylvania, United States. The community is located on Pennsylvania Route 28, south-southwest of New Bethlehem near Mahoning creek.

History
Mahoning Furnace is the location where a steam, cold-blast, charcoal furnace, was erected by Alexander and John A. Colwell in the summer of 1845. A post office called Mahoning Furnace was established in 1877 and remained in operation until 1886.

References

Unincorporated communities in Armstrong County, Pennsylvania
Unincorporated communities in Pennsylvania